Vespers in Vienna is a 1947 novel by Scottish writer Bruce Marshall.

Plot summary
Shortly after the end of World War II, British Army Colonel Michael 'Hooky' Nicobar is assigned to the Displaced Persons Division in the British Zone of Vienna, Allied occupied Austria. Like the author himself, Nicobar has had a limb amputated. Marshall also served in the Displaced Persons Division in Austria.

Nicobar's orders are to aid the Soviet Red Army and the NKVD in the forcible repatriation of alleged citizens of the Soviet Union as part of Operation Keelhaul. Billeted in the convent run by Mother Auxilia, Nicobar, and his military aides Major John 'Twingo' McPhimister and Audrey Quail, become involved in the plight of Maria, a young Volga German ballerina, who is trying to avoid being returned to Moscow, as she, like many others refugees, fears torture, execution, or the Gulag immediately upon returning to her home country. Colonel Nicobar's sense of duty is tested as he sees first hand the plight of the people he is forcibly repatriating to the Soviet Union; his lack of religious faith is also shaken by his contact with the Mother Superior.

The novel was the basis of the 1949 film The Red Danube starring Walter Pidgeon, Ethel Barrymore, Peter Lawford, Angela Lansbury and Janet Leigh. George Sidney directed.

After the movie was released the novel was re-issued as The Red Danube.

References

1947 British novels
British collusion with Soviet World War II crimes
British novels adapted into films
Houghton Mifflin books
Novels by Bruce Marshall
Novels set in Vienna